Ann-Britt Leyman (later Olsson; 10 June 1922 – 5 January 2013) was a Swedish sprinter and long jumper who won a bronze medal in the long jump at the 1948 Summer Olympics.

Leyman never won a national long jump title, but she won 15 national sprint championships: in the 80 m (1941), 100 m (1942–44 and 1946–49) and 200 m (1942–47 and 1949). At the 1946 European Athletics Championships she finished fourth-sixth in the 100 m, 200 m and 4 × 100 m relay events.

References

Further reading 
 

1922 births
2013 deaths
Swedish female long jumpers
Swedish female sprinters
Olympic bronze medalists for Sweden
Athletes (track and field) at the 1948 Summer Olympics
Olympic athletes of Sweden
Medalists at the 1948 Summer Olympics
Olympic bronze medalists in athletics (track and field)
20th-century Swedish women